Capian is a commune in the Gironde department in Nouvelle-Aquitaine in southwestern France.

It is located southwest of Bordeaux on the Garonne river. The commune is in the middle of the Bordeaux wine appellation AOC Premieres Cotes de Bordeaux. Many of the villagers own or work in wineries.

Population

Vineyard 
Château Suau (Capian)

See also
Communes of the Gironde department

References

Communes of Gironde